Godofredo Basso (born 8 November 1901, date of death unknown) was a Cuban sports shooter. He competed in the 50 m pistol event at the 1948 Summer Olympics.

References

External links

1901 births
Year of death missing
People from Trinidad, Cuba
Cuban male sport shooters
Olympic shooters of Cuba
Shooters at the 1948 Summer Olympics
20th-century Cuban people